Lashio District is a district of Shan State in Myanmar. It consisted of four towns and 2431 villages in 2001.

Townships

The district contains four townships, including:

Lashio Township
Hsenwi Township
Mongyai Township
Tangyan Township also spelled as Tangyang Township
Kunlong Township (formerly part of Kunlong District)

At one point, Lashio District also included the following townships, which became now part of Hopang District. Therefore, they are no longer part of Lashio District since September 2011.
Mongmao Township 
Namphan Township also spelled as Naphan Township
Pangsang Township also spelled as Panhkam Township
Pangwaun Township also spelled as Panwai Township

References

Districts of Myanmar
Geography of Shan State